Marko Milanović is Professor of Public International Law at the Faculty of Law of the University of Reading. He is an editor of the European Journal of International Law and its blog, EJIL: Talk!.

Works

References

International law scholars
Academics of the University of Nottingham